John Greene may refer to:

John Greene (settler) (1597–1658), early settler and co-founder of Warwick, Rhode Island
John Greene Jr. (1620–1708), deputy governor of Rhode Island (1690–1700)
John Greene (American football) (1920–2010), American professional football player
John Greene (Medal of Honor) (fl. 1862), American Civil War sailor and Medal of Honor recipient
John Greene (Kilkenny MP) (died 1883), Irish Member of UK Parliament
John P. Greene (1793–1844), early leader in the Latter Day Saint movement
John L. Greene (Ohio politician) (1806–1879), American politician, judge and lawyer
John Thomas Greene Jr. (1929–2011), U.S. federal judge
John Greene (American politician), American politician who served in the Arizona State Senate
John William Greene (1876–1959), Australian politician
John Greene, Canadian politician who led the Newfoundland and Labrador New Democratic Party from 1977 to 1980
John Edmund Greene (1894–1918), Canadian WWI pilot
John Holden Greene (1777–1850), Federal Period architect Providence, Rhode Island
John L. Greene (1912-1995), American screenwriter
John M. Greene (1928–2007), American theoretical physicist and applied mathematician
John Nassau Greene (fl. 1938), Irish politician
John Robert Greene (born 1955), professor of American history
John Beasley Greene (1832–1856), Egyptologist
John C. Greene (1926–2016), American dentist and public health administrator
Joe Greene (Ontario politician) (John James Greene, 1920–1978), Canadian politician
John Greene, abbot of Welbeck Abbey (1450)

See also
John Green (disambiguation)
Jack Greene (1930–2013), American country musician
Jackie Greene (born 1980), American singer-songwriter and musician